Dumas Beach is a rural beach along the Arabian Sea, located  southwest of the city of Surat in the Indian state of Gujarat. It is a popular tourist destination in South Gujarat.  Dumas Beach is justly famous for being in the top 35 haunted spots in India.

Dumas beach is known for its black sand and is considered to be haunted  because it was once used as a Hindu cremation site, according to folklore.

Places of interest

Apart from the beach, places of interest at Dumas include the Dariya Ganesh Temple located adjacent to the main beach. The promenade has several shops selling Indian snacks like Bhajiya (including the famous "Lashkari Tomato Bhajiya"), Pav Bhaji, sweet corn roasted on charcoal, besides Indian Chinese cuisine. There are also several restaurants serving Punjabi food and Indian food with vegetarian options for people.

Myth of haunting
According to folklore, the legend of the beach being haunted is thought to be rooted in the widespread belief by locals that the beach was formerly a cremation ground and is also attributed to the black sands and isolated location of the beach. Most of the reports of supernatural occurrences on the beach remain unproven and unverified and might be an urban legend so far.

See also
 Gulf of Khambhat
 List of tourist attractions in Surat
 Tapti River

References

Beaches of Surat
History of Surat